Minuscule 29 (in the Gregory-Aland numbering), ε 1022 (Soden). It is a Greek minuscule manuscript of the New Testament, written on vellum. Palaeographically it has been assigned to the 10th century.

Description 

The codex contains the text of the four Gospels on 169 parchment leaves. In the three later Gospels some leaves lost (Matthew 1-15; Mark 16:15-20; Luke 4:28-5:7), and were supplied in the 15th century by paper leaves. The text is written in one column per page, 30 lines per page. It is beautifully but carelessly written by a Latin scribe. The initial letters are written in colour.

There is also a division according to the Ammonian Sections (in Mark 234, the last in 16:9) with references to the Eusebian Canons.

It contains the Prolegomena of Cosmas, Eusebian Canon tables at the beginning, subscriptions at the end of each Gospel, liturgical books with hagiographies (Synaxarion and Menologion), and scholia at the margin.

It contains corrections on the margin made by prima manu.

Text 
The Greek text of the codex is a representative of the Byzantine text-type. Aland place it in Category V.

According to the Claremont Profile Method it represents textual family Kx in Luke 1 and Luke 20. In Luke 10 no profile was made. It was corrected toward Πb.

History 

F. H. A. Scrivener dated the manuscript to the 12th century. Currently it is dated by the INTF to the 10th century.

The manuscript was brought from Greece. It was added to the list of the New Testament manuscripts by J. J. Wettstein, who gave it the number 29.

The manuscript was examined by John Mill (Colbertinus 3). Mill compares its text with that of Minuscule 71 and found some affinities. Scholz (1794-1852) examined only texts of Mark 1-5 and John 5-8. It was examined and described by Paulin Martin. C. R. Gregory saw the manuscript in 1885.

It is currently housed at the Bibliothèque nationale de France (Gr. 89) at Paris.

See also 

 List of New Testament minuscules
 Biblical manuscript
 Textual criticism

References

Further reading 

 Kirsopp Lake & Silva Lake, "Family 13 (The Ferrar Group): The Text According to Mark", Studies & Documents 11, 1941

External links 
Online Images of minuscule 29 (Digital Microfilm) at the National Library of France.

Online Images of minuscule 29 (Digital Microfilm) at the CSNTM.

Greek New Testament minuscules
10th-century biblical manuscripts
Bibliothèque nationale de France collections